Grandmother (Czech: Babička) is a 1940 Czech drama film directed by František Čáp. This film has been produced by Vilém Brož and music composed by Jiří Fiala.

Cast
 Terezie Brzková as Grandmother
 Světla Svozilová as Terezka
 Karel Trešňák as Jan Prošek
 Nataša Tanská as Barunka
 Jiří Papež as Jan
 Jitka Dušková as Adélka
 Gustav Nezval as Gamekeeper
 Jiřina Štěpničková as Viktorka

References

External links
 

1940 films
1940s Czech-language films
Czech drama films
1940 drama films
Films directed by František Čáp
Czechoslovak black-and-white films
Films based on works by Božena Němcová
1940s Czech films